is a Japanese football player who plays for FC Ryukyu.

Career
He made his professional debut in the AFC Champions League on 16 May 2012, in a group stage match against Adelaide United.

Club statistics
Updated to end of 2018 season.

1Includes Promotion Playoffs to J1.

References

External links
Profile at Zweigen Kanazawa
Profile at Omiya Ardija

1990 births
Living people
Association football people from Gifu Prefecture
Japanese footballers
Japanese expatriate footballers
J1 League players
J2 League players
Gamba Osaka players
Kamatamare Sanuki players
Omiya Ardija players
Zweigen Kanazawa players
FC Ryukyu players
Japanese expatriate sportspeople in Brazil
Expatriate footballers in Brazil
Association football defenders